Colobosaura modesta, the Bahia colobosaura, is a species of lizard in the family Gymnophthalmidae. It is found in Brazil and Paraguay.

References

Colobosaura
Lizards of South America
Reptiles of Brazil
Reptiles of Paraguay
Reptiles described in 1862
Taxa named by Johannes Theodor Reinhardt
Taxa named by Christian Frederik Lütken